Rosemont Camp is a populated place situated in Pima County, Arizona, United States.

References

External links
 Rosemont – ghosttowns.com

Ghost towns in Arizona
Populated places in Pima County, Arizona